The Roswell Butler Hard House is a house located at 815 W. First St. in Antioch, California. Roswell Butler Hard, a prominent early resident of Antioch, built the house in 1869. Hard was the first chairman of the Antioch town council, which originally met in his house; he also served as county sheriff and supervisor. The two-story Italianate house was built entirely from brick made in the city. It was split into smaller housing units after Hart's death; in 1979, the city of Antioch took ownership of the building, and it has fallen into disuse since.

The house was listed on the National Register of Historic Places on September 30, 1993.

See also
National Register of Historic Places listings in Contra Costa County, California

References

External links 

AB 639 Intent to preserve building

History of Contra Costa County, California
Historic districts on the National Register of Historic Places in California
National Register of Historic Places in Contra Costa County, California
Antioch, California
Houses on the National Register of Historic Places in California
Houses completed in 1869
Houses in Contra Costa County, California
1869 establishments in California